Hans Schröder may refer to:

 Hans Schröder (footballer) (1906–1970), German international footballer
 Hans Schröder (artist) (1931–2010), German sculptor and painter

See also
 Schröder
 Han Schröder (1918–1992), Dutch architect and educator
 Hans Schrader (1869–1948), German archaeologist and art historian
 Johann Samuel Schroeter (1753–1788), German pianist and composer
 Johann Samuel Schröter (1735–1808), German pastor, conchologist, mineralogist and palaeontologist
 Johann Hieronymus Schröter (1745–1816), German astronomer
Hans Wilhelm Schrøder (24 June 1810 – 14 April 1888), Danish architect